Adewale Adeyinka (born 14 December 1996) is a Nigerian professional footballer who plays as a goalkeeper for   Akwa United and the Nigeria national team. He is a former Nigeria U17 team player.

Adeyinka won the Nigeria Professional Football League title with Akwa United in the 2020-21 season.

The Kwara native holds the record for most consecutive clean sheets in the Nigeria Professional Football League, after going 16 matches without conceding a goal in the 2020-21 season.

Honours

Club
Akwa United
 Nigeria Professional Football League: 2020-21

Individual
 Most consecutive clean sheets in the Nigeria Professional Football League (16)

References

Living people
1996 births
Association football goalkeepers
Nigerian footballers
Nigeria Professional Football League players
Akwa United F.C. players
Sportspeople from Kwara State